Etsberg (Limburgish: Ètsberg) is a hamlet in the Dutch province of Limburg. It is a part of the municipality of Roerdalen, and lies about 9 km southeast of Roermond.

It was first mentioned between 1803 and 1820 as Etzenberg. The etymology is unclear. Unlike most hamlets, Etsberg has a dense triangular core. It was home to 234 people in 1840.

References

Populated places in Limburg (Netherlands)
Roerdalen